"Miracle" is the debut single by Olive, from their 1996 debut album Extra Virgin. The song was written by members Tim Kellett and Robin Taylor-Firth. It was originally released in 1996 but was re-released in 1997 including a new UK Radio Edit that was different from the version that appears on the album.

The song was featured on the soundtrack to the 1998 movie Sliding Doors.

Track listing 

UK CD single
 "Miracle" (Radio Edit)
 "Miracle" (Black Olive's 12" Mix)
 "Miracle" (Monkey Mafia Remix)
 "Miracle" (Doc Scott Remix)
 "Miracle" (Black Olive Deeper Dub)

UK re-release CD single
 "Miracle" (Radio Edit)
 "Miracle" (Black Olive's Extended Mix)
 "Miracle" (Deep Dish Miracle of Dub Mix)
 "Miracle" (Monkey Mafia Remix)
 "Miracle" (Roni Size Remix)
 "Miracle" (Black Olive's Deeper Dub)

UK second re-release CD1
 "Miracle" (Radio Edit)
 "Miracle" (Murk Club Mix)
 "Miracle" (Funky Green Mix)
 "Miracle" (Beloved Club Vocal Mix)
 "Miracle" (187 Lockdown's Deep Dub)

UK second re-release CD2
 "Miracle" (Radio Edit)
 "Miracle" (Roni Size Remix)
 "You're Not Alone" (Oakenfold / Osborne Remix)
 "Killing"

Charts

References

1996 debut singles
1997 singles
Olive (band) songs
Songs written by Tim Kellett
Songs written by Robin Taylor-Firth
1996 songs
RCA Records singles